was a Japanese engineer and inventor. He is known for his electronic inventions since the 1950s, including the PIN diode, static induction transistor, static induction thyristor, SIT/SITh. His inventions contributed to the development of internet technology and the information age.

He was a professor at Sophia University. He is considered the "Father of Japanese Microelectronics".

Biography
Nishizawa was born in Sendai, Japan, on September 12, 1926. He earned a B.S. in 1948, and a Doctor of Engineering degree in 1960, from Tohoku University.

In 1953, he joined the Research Institute of Electrical Communication at Tohoku University.
He became a professor there and was appointed director to two research institutes.
From 1990 to 1996, Nishizawa served as the President of Tohoku University.

He became the president of Iwate Prefectural University in 1998.

Research
In 1950, the static induction transistor was invented by Jun-ichi Nishizawa and Y. Watanabe. The PIN photodiode was also invented by Nishizawa and his colleagues in 1950.

In 1952, he invented the avalanche photodiode. He then invented a solid-state maser in 1955. This was followed by his proposal for a semiconductor optical maser in 1957, a year before Schawlow and Townes's first paper on optical masers.

While working at Tohoku University, he proposed fiber-optic communication, the use of optical fibers for optical communication, in 1963. Nishizawa other invented technologies in the 1960s that contributed to the development of optical fiber communications, such as the graded-index optical fiber as a channel for transmitting light from semiconductor lasers. He patented the graded-index optical fiber in 1964.

In 1971, he invented the static induction thyristor.

Recognition
Nishizawa was a Life Fellow of the IEEE. He is a Fellow of several other institutions, including the Physical Society, the Russian Academy of Sciences, and the Polish Academy of Sciences.  Nishizawa was decorated with Order of Culture by the emperor of Japan in 1989. He also received the Japan Academy Prize (1974), IEEE Jack A. Morton Award (1983), the Honda Prize and the Laudise Prize of the International Organization for Crystal Growth (1989).
IEEE conferred the Edison Medal on him in 2000, and introduced the IEEE Jun-ichi Nishizawa Medal in 2002. He has more than a thousand patents registered under his name.

References

External links
Jun-ichi Nishizawa – Biographical article on IEEE Global History Network.

1926 births
2018 deaths
People from Sendai
Japanese physicists
Japanese inventors
Fellow Members of the IEEE
IEEE Edison Medal recipients
Tohoku University alumni
Academic staff of Tohoku University
Academic staff of Sophia University
Recipients of the Order of Culture
Recipients of the Order of the Sacred Treasure, 1st class
Foreign Members of the USSR Academy of Sciences
Foreign Members of the Russian Academy of Sciences